Lisses is a commune in the Essonne department in Île-de-France in northern France.

Origin of the city name
The name origin of this commune is not well known. One hypothesis is that Lisses is coming from the Latin Licia villa, as the initial village developed around the Lisses estate. 
Another hypothesis is that Lisses has German origins: Listja, meaning barrier.
This commune was created in 1793 under its current name.

Population

Twin city
Lisses is partnered with Aue-Fallstein in Germany.

Education
The commune has three primary school groups (combined preschool and elementary school), Frédéric Mistral, Jean-Baptiste Corot, and Joachim du Bellay; as well as one junior high school, Collège Rosa Luxemburg.

Lisses in art and culture
The name of this commune is used to identify a rest area on the A6 motorway
Parkour was developed in Lisses and nearby Courcouronnes, having been created by David Belle, who has resided in Lisses since the 1980s.

See also
Communes of the Essonne department

References

External links

Official website 

Mayors of Essonne Association 

Communes of Essonne